Charles Hayes was a Negro league infielder between 1938 and 1940.

Hayes made his Negro leagues debut in 1938 with the Indianapolis ABCs. He was on the club again in 1940 when it played as the "St. Louis–New Orleans Stars". Hayes also played for the Philadelphia Stars in 1940, his final professional season.

References

External links
 and Seamheads

Place of birth missing
Place of death missing
Year of birth missing
Year of death missing
St. Louis–New Orleans Stars players
Philadelphia Stars players
Baseball infielders